Life is a Dance may refer to:

Music

Albums
Life's a Dance, album by John Michael Montgomery
Life Is a Dance: The Remix Project Chaka Khan

Songs
Life's a Dance (song), song by John Michael Montgomery
"Life Is a Dance", a song by Chaka Khan, Chaka Khan discography